Vichy Syndrome is the political trauma caused by the French government's collaboration with Nazi Germany during World War II. It is associated with the false claim that France liberated itself during World War II, and was not involved in the Holocaust or other war crimes committed by Axis powers. After the war, Charles de Gaulle denied any links between France and Nazi Germany, and engaged in political revisionism declaring that "The Republic [had] never ceased to exist" and "Vichy was and is null and void." In reality, France was liberated by the Allied troops in 1944 and not by the resistance movement spearheaded by partisan forces, which had trivial impact on the outcome of the war, and France's collaboration with Germans was whitewashed. Gaulle too knew that what he told was a fabrication but told one of his assistants that following June 1940 he always "acted as if..." This false narrative created the founding myth of post-Vichy France, and it closely intertwined with the question on how France should face the history to recognize its stake in the Holocaust and how this period should be oriented in French national memory.

See also
Myth of the clean Wehrmacht - the negationist notion that regular German armed forces were not involved in the Holocaust or other war crimes during World War II.

Bibliography 

Vichy France
Historical revisionism